Pietro Biondi (born 13 October 1939) is an Italian actor and voice actor.

Biography
Born in Spoleto, Biondi has appeared in over 12 films and 14 television shows. He has also made numerous appearances on stage. As a voice actor, Biondi is best known for providing the Italian voice of Andy Sipowicz (portrayed by Dennis Franz) in the television show NYPD Blue as well as Caleb Nichol (portrayed by Alan Dale) in the Italian dub of The O.C.. He has also dubbed actors which include Christopher Plummer, Harvey Keitel, Donald Sutherland, Robert Duvall, Walter Matthau and J. T. Walsh in some of their work.

Personal life
Biondi is married to actress and voice actress Rita Di Lernia.

Filmography

Cinema
 We Want the Colonels (1973) - Professor Pube
 The Assassination of Matteotti (1973) - Filippo Filippelli
 The Suspect (1975) - Officer of the OVRA
 Antonio Gramsci: The Days of Prison (1977)
 Together? (1979) - Berto
 Three Brothers (1981) - 1st Judge
 La posta in gioco (1988) - The Mayor
 Giovanni Falcone (1993) - Bruno Contrada 'U Dottore'
 Il giorno del giudizio (1994) - Arturo
 Ultimo bersaglio (1996) - Alvise Jesurum
 Commercial Break (1997) - Pierluigi Colombo
 The Embalmer (2002) - Deborah's Father
 Italian Dream (2007)
 Il Divo (2008) - Francesco Cossiga
 Dove cadono le ombre (2017) - Paul

Voice work

Dubbed actors
 Christopher Plummer in A Beautiful Mind, The Lake House, Ordeal by Innocence, Muhammad Ali's Greatest Fight and Hector and the Search for Happiness
 Donald Sutherland in Disclosure, A Dry White Season, Cold Mountain, Pride & Prejudice and Horrible Bosses
 Harvey Keitel in Thelma & Louise, Pulp Fiction and Cop Land
 William Redfield in One Flew Over the Cuckoo's Nest
 Jeffrey DeMunn in The Shawshank Redemption
 Ben Gazzara in The Thomas Crown Affair
 Tom Courtenay in The Golden Compass
 Ian McKellen in Beauty and the Beast
 David Carradine in Bird on a Wire
 James Garner in Space Cowboys
 Robert Duvall in Falling Down
 Gary Busey in Point Break
 Vincent Schiavelli in Ghost
 Rip Torn in Wonder Boys
 Ken Howard in J. Edgar
 Brian Cox in Rob Roy

Animation
 Merlock in DuckTales the Movie: Treasure of the Lost Lamp
 Rick Dicker in The Incredibles
 Anton Ego in Ratatouille
 Vitruvius in The Lego Movie

References

External links
 
 
 

1939 births
Living people
People from Spoleto
Italian male film actors
Italian male voice actors
Italian male stage actors
Italian male television actors